The 1947 Tulsa Golden Hurricane football team was an American football team represented the University of Tulsa as a member of the Missouri Valley Conference during the 1947 college football season. In its second year under head coach Buddy Brothers, the team compiled a 5–5 record (3–0 against conference opponents), won the conference championship, and outscored opponents by a total of 143 to 128.

Schedule

References

Tulsa
Tulsa Golden Hurricane football seasons
Missouri Valley Conference football champion seasons
Tulsa Golden Hurricane football